The 1992 United States presidential election in South Dakota took place on November 3, 1992, as part of the 1992 United States presidential election. Voters chose three representatives, or electors to the Electoral College, who voted for president and vice president.

South Dakota was won by incumbent President George H. W. Bush (R-Texas) with 40.66% of the popular vote over Governor Bill Clinton (D-Arkansas) with 37.14%. Businessman Ross Perot (I-Texas) finished in third, with 21.80% of the popular vote. Clinton ultimately won the national vote, defeating incumbent President Bush and Perot. , this is the last election in which Spink County, Hanson County, Davison County, and Aurora County voted for a Democratic presidential candidate.

Despite winning the state, Bush's 40.66% of the vote remains the worst performance for a Republican in South Dakota since Herbert Hoover's 34.4% in 1932, and the second-worst ever (after the 1932 election) for a Republican on the ballot in the state.

Results

Results by county

See also
 Presidency of Bill Clinton
 United States presidential elections in South Dakota

Notes

References

South Dakota
1992
1992 South Dakota elections